The Nathan Franko Orchestra played extensively in New York and New Jersey in the early 1900s, they were led by Nathan Franko.   The Nathan Franko sounds were indicative of a new era in America and its enjoyment of music.

References

Musical groups from New York City